"Sorry (I Didn't Know)" is a song by UK garage duo Monsta Boy featuring Denzie on vocals. It was first released in 1999 on white label, then officially released as a single the following year via Locked On Records and XL Recordings. The song reached number 25 on the UK Singles Chart, and number one on the UK Dance Singles Chart in October 2000.

Capital Xtra included the song in their list of "The Best Old-School Garage Anthems of All Time".

Certifications

Joel Corry version

"Sorry (I Didn't Know)" was covered by English DJ and producer Joel Corry, retitled "Sorry", and was released on 4 April 2019 through Perfect Havoc and Asylum Records. It features uncredited vocals by Hayley May. The song broke the record for the most Shazamed track in one day, with 41,000 Shazams on 24 July. It further ascended the UK Singles Chart after being featured on British reality TV series Love Island, reaching the top 10 in August 2019.

Background
Corry stated that he was influenced by UK garage growing up, and that it played a "huge role in [his] development as a DJ and a producer".

Commercial performance
"Sorry" reached number six on the UK Singles Chart in August 2019.

Charts

Weekly charts

Year-end charts

Certifications

Other versions
In 2006, Dutch group the Partysquad with RMXCRW and Gio released their version titled "I'm Sorry", from the album De Bazen Van De Club, which also contains samples from the David Howard remix of Monsta Boy's "Sorry (I Didn't Know)". "I'm Sorry" reached No. 14 on the Dutch Single Top 100.

In 2018, the House & Garage Orchestra together with Denzee recorded an orchestral version of the song for the UK garage covers album Garage Classics.

References

1999 songs
2000 singles
UK garage songs
Locked On Records singles
XL Recordings singles
2019 singles
Joel Corry songs
Asylum Records singles
Tropical house songs